Sunshine Machine is a British professional wrestling tag team consisting of Chuck Mambo (real name Gareth Snelling) (born 16 September 1992, Newquay, England) and TK Cooper (real name Tasman Bartlett-Masina) (born 18 April 1993, Auckland, New Zealand) currently signed to the English professional wrestling promotion Progress Wrestling. They are also performing in the British independent scene, where they are best known for competing in Revolution Pro Wrestling and various other promotions.

Professional wrestling career

British inpendent scene (2018-present)
Due to mainly evolving as freelancers, Mambo and Cooper are known for competing in various promotions from the British independent scene. They made their debut as a team at ‘’Empire The Gauntlet”, a house show promoted by the Empire Wrestling promotion on September 23, 2018, where they competed in a gauntlet tag team match for the vacant Empire Tag Team Championship, bout won by Trial By Violence (Gabriel Kidd and Saxon Huxley), and also involving other notable teams such as Brendan White and Wild Boar, Amir Jordan and Prince Ameen, and many others. On the first night of  Over the Top Wrestling’s eighth anniversary event from October 28, 2022, Mambo and Cooper defeated Millie McKenzie and Session Moth Martina in an intergender tag team match.

Progress Wrestling (2021-present) 
 
Chuck Mambo and TK Cooper made their debut in Progress Wrestling at PROGRESS Chapter 107 on March 27, 2021, where they defeated The Young Guns (Ethan Allen and Luke Jacobs). Mambo and Cooper won the PROGRESS Tag Team Championship for the first time as a team by defeating The 0121 (Dan Moloney and Man Like DeReiss). At Progress Chapter 132 on April 17, 2022, Mambo and Cooper fell short to The 0121 (Dan Moloney & Man Like DeReiss) for the PROGRESS Tag Team Championship. At PROGRESS Chapter 136 on July 24, 2022, Mambo and Cooper successfully defended the PROGRESS Tag Team Championship against Leon Slater and Ricky Knight Jr..

Revolution Pro Wrestling (2020-present) 
Chuck Mambo and TK Cooper made their debut in Revolution Pro Wrestling under the name of Escaping The Midcard at RevPro Live In Southampton 12 on February 23, 2020, where they fell short to The Legion (Rampage Brown and Great-O-Khan). At RevPro High Stakes on January 29, 2022, Mambo and Cooper successfully defended their Rev Pro British Tag Team Championship against Aussie Open (Kyle Fletcher and Mark Davis). Mambo and Cooper participated in the 2022 edition of thr Revolution Great British Tag League where they placed themselves in the Block B and scored a total of three points after fighting against various teams such as The VeloCities (Jude London & Paris De Silva), The Legion (Shota Umino & Yota Tsuji) and Lykos Gym (Kid Lykos & Kid Lykos II).

Championships and accomplishments
Attack! Pro Wrestling
Attack! 24:7 Championship (4 times) – Mambo
Breed Pro Wrestling
Breed Pro Championship (1 time) – Cooper
Pro Wrestling Ambush
Ambush Championship (1 time) – Cooper
Pro Wrestling Illustrated
Ranked TK Cooper No. 162 of the top 500 singles wrestlers in the PWI Men's 500 in 2017
Ranked Chuck Mambo No. 320 of the top 500 singles wrestlers in the PWI Men's 500 in 2020
Progress Wrestling
PROGRESS Tag Team Championship (1 time, current)
Progress World Cup (2018) – Mambo
Riot Cabaret Wrestling
Riot Cabaret World Championship (1 time) – Mambo
Revolution Pro Wrestling
Rev Pro British Tag Team Championship (1 time)
Riptide Wrestling
Riptide Brighton Championship (1 time) – Mambo
Tidal Championship Wrestling
TCW Championship (1 time) – Mambo

References

Independent promotions teams and stables
British professional wrestlers
New Zealand professional wrestlers